The 1986–87 season was Liverpool Football Club's 95th season in existence and their 25th consecutive season in the First Division. It was their second season under the management of Kenny Dalglish, and as defending double winners they finished this season only having (jointly) won the FA Charity Shield, coming close to silverware as league runners-up and losing finalists in the League Cup. They finished runners-up in the league nine points behind local rivals Everton, after an eventful title race which had seen them fight out with a resurgent Arsenal and Tottenham Hotspur as well as face surprise challenges during the season from unfancied sides including Norwich City, Luton Town and newly promoted Wimbledon.

At the end of the season, striker Ian Rush headed to Italy to sign for Juventus. His successor in the Liverpool attack, John Aldridge, had been signed during the season from Oxford United. After the season ended, Dalglish further enhanced Liverpool's forward positions with a move for Newcastle United striker Peter Beardsley and Watford winger John Barnes.

Squad

Goalkeepers

  Bruce Grobbelaar
  Mike Hooper

Defenders

  Gary Ablett
  Jim Beglin
  Gary Gillespie
  Alan Hansen
  Mark Lawrenson
  John McGregor
  Steve Nicol
  Steve Staunton
  Barry Venison
  Alex Watson

Midfielders

  Kenny Dalglish
   Craig Johnston
  Sammy Lee
  Kevin MacDonald
  Steve McMahon
  Jan Mølby
  Brian Mooney
  Steve Nicol
  Mark Seagraves
  Nigel Spackman
  John Wark
  Ronnie Whelan

Attackers

  John Aldridge
  John Durnin
  Alan Irvine
  Ian Rush
  Paul Walsh

Transfers

In

Out

League table

Matches

First Division

FA Charity Shield

FA Cup

League Cup
															

Final

Super Cup

Final
First Leg

Second leg

Liverpool won 7–2 on aggregate

Dubai Super Cup

References

LFC History.net – Games for the 1986-87 season
Liverweb - Games for the 1986–87 season

Liverpool F.C. seasons
Liverpool F.C.